James Douglas Meredith Hinchcliffe (born December 5, 1986) is a Canadian race car driver and commentator best known for competing in the IndyCar Series. Hinchcliffe won six races for Andretti Autosport and Schmidt Peterson Motorsports. In 2015, his first year driving for Schmidt Peterson, he suffered life-threatening blood loss when he was impaled in a crash when his suspension failed while practicing for the Indianapolis 500. He would recover and win the pole position for the following year's race. In 2016, he appeared on season 23 of the ABC series Dancing with the Stars, finishing in second place. He's often called by his nicknames Hinch and Hinchtown.

Racing career

Early racing
Born in North York and raised in Oakville, Ontario, Hinchcliffe started his career when he received a kart for his 9th birthday and began car racing in 2003, when he finished third in Bridgestone Racing Academy F2000 series. Next year, he was top rookie in Formula BMW USA, winning three races. In 2005, he raced in the Star Mazda Series, finishing third overall with three wins. In 2006 he moved to the Champ Car Atlantic Series with Forsythe Racing. He won one race at Portland and scored two other podiums, but was only able to finish 10th in the overall standings. Hinchcliffe also provided commentary for the Eurosport coverage of Champ Car events during the 2006 and 2007 seasons.

A1 Grand Prix
He then joined A1 Team Canada in A1 Grand Prix. He finished eighth in the sprint race and 13th in the feature in his first race at Zandvoort, then had a stunning weekend in Brno. He scored second in the sprint race at the Czech round and led the feature for the majority of the race, but clashed with eventual winner Alex Yoong which dropped him down to fifth. He raced next at the Beijing round, finishing fourth in the sprint race and 10th in the feature race – which he could have won but for a team pitstop strategy error – and then returned after two races out at the New Zealand round, where he finished sixth in both races.

Hinchcliffe once again raced in the Champ Car Atlantic Series in 2007, this time with the Sierra Sierra team. He finished fourth in points without a win. During the season he was also a guest commentator on the international feed for Champ Car races. He returned to Forsythe Racing for the 2008 Atlantic Championship season, again finishing fourth in points but this time capturing a win in the second race of the season at Mazda Raceway Laguna Seca.

Firestone Indy Lights Series
For the 2009 season, he competed in Indy Lights for Sam Schmidt Motorsports in their No. 7 car. Hinchcliffe finished fourth in points without a win or pole position. In the 2010 season, he signed on with the less historically-successful Team Moore Racing in their No. 2 entry. Hinchcliffe captured three wins and five more podium finishes on his way to second in the championship behind French rookie Jean-Karl Vernay who was driving the Schmidt No. 7 car.

He also served as the driver analyst for the Indianapolis Motor Speedway Radio Network for the 2010 Indianapolis 500 as regular driver analyst Davey Hamilton was competing in the race.

IndyCar Series

Newman/Haas Racing (2011)
In April 2011, Hinchcliffe signed with Newman/Haas Racing to compete in the remainder of 2011 IndyCar Series, excluding the Twin Ring Motegi race, after missing the first race of the season at St. Petersburg. He made his debut at Barber Motorsports Park and failed to finish after making contact with a spinning E. J. Viso. He then picked up his first career Top 5 finish in just his second start in the series on the Streets of Long Beach with a fourth-place finish. Hinchcliffe then collected a top ten on the Streets of São Paulo in Brazil. He finished ninth. Hinchcliffe started 13th in his first Indianapolis 500, and ran up front for an early portion of the race before crashing on lap 101 and finishing 29th.

Following the Indy 500 was the Firestone Twin 275s in Texas. Hinchcliffe, however, struggled in both races and had finishes of 20th and 19th, respectively. Hinchcliffe then rebounded to collect his second Top 10 of the season with a sixth at the Milwaukee Mile. During the 2011 IZOD IndyCar World Championship on lap 12, he went veered down, making wheel-to-wheel contact with Wade Cunningham, which caused the latter to spin and collect various drivers, that would lead to various chain reactions, causing the death of Dan Wheldon. After the race was cancelled due to Wheldon’s death, points were reset to how it was as of Kentucky, so Hinchcliffe collected Rookie of the Year Honors, just beating out Panther Racing's J. R. Hildebrand. However, after the 2011 IndyCar season it was announced that Newman/Haas Racing would not be returning to IndyCar making Hinchcliffe a free agent.

Andretti Autosport (2012–14)

On January 10, 2012, it was announced that Hinchcliffe would succeed Danica Patrick as the driver of the GoDaddy car for Andretti Autosport. The car was renumbered to No. 27, the same number used by Canadian drivers Gilles Villeneuve and Jacques Villeneuve. At the 2012 Indianapolis 500, Hinchcliffe qualified 2nd overall while carrying a pair of gloves inside his driving suit, that belonged to the late Greg Moore, whom Hinchcliffe considers the main reason why he got into racing. On race day, Hinchcliffe overtook pole-sitter Ryan Briscoe on the first lap, and ended up leading five of the 200 laps on his way to a creditable 6th-place finish.

Hinchcliffe returned to Andretti for 2013, and started the season by winning the season opener in St. Petersburg, Florida, for his first series victory. Later, in Brazil for the São Paulo Indy 300, Hinchcliffe won the race, with a last turn overtake under Takuma Sato, breaking the winning sequence of Will Power.

In the 2014 Grand Prix of Indianapolis, Hinchcliffe was hit by debris, and a CT scan revealed he had suffered a concussion, and needed medical clearance before racing again. Hinchcliffe was cleared to return to racing on May 15.

Schmidt Peterson Motorsports (2015–2019)

On October 7, 2014, it was announced that Hinchcliffe would join Schmidt Peterson Motorsports for the 2015 season and drive the No. 5 car, filling the open seat left by Simon Pagenaud. He won his first race with the team in the second race of the year in New Orleans. Hinchcliffe sustained serious injuries in a crash caused by a suspension failure during practice for the 2015 Indianapolis 500, on May 18. He remained hospitalized during the race and Ryan Briscoe took Hinchcliffe's position for the race. Briscoe and Conor Daly replaced Hinchcliffe in the car for the remainder of the 2015 season.

On May 22, 2016, Hinchcliffe won the pole position for the 100th running of the Indianapolis 500, a year after his near-fatal crash at the track. He finished seventh in the race. Hinchcliffe led much of the Firestone 600 later that year, only to finish second in a photo finish to Graham Rahal. He went on to finish 13th in the season standings.

On April 9, 2017, two years after his last win, Hinchcliffe won his first race of the season at the Long Beach Grand Prix.

Leena Gade became Hinchcliffe's lead race engineer for the 2018 season, becoming the first female lead race engineer in Indycar.  On Bump Day for the 2018 Indianapolis 500, Hinchcliffe ended up failing to qualify for the first time in his career. Afterward, Gade and SPM parted ways. In July, Hinchcliffe rebounded to win at Iowa.

On October 28, 2019, after a season which resulted in a best finish of 3rd at Iowa, the recently renamed Arrow McLaren SP relieved Hinchcliffe of his driving duties and signed 2019 Indy Lights champion Oliver Askew and former Carlin driver and 2018 Indy Lights champion Patricio O'Ward to fill their two seats. Hinchcliffe remained under contract, under which he was required to be with the team on race weekends and make sponsor appearances, but was free to pursue other opportunities.

Return to Andretti Autosport (2020–2021)
On February 19, 2020, Andretti Autosport announced they have signed Hinchcliffe to a three-race deal for the 2020 season which will be his second stint with the team. Hinchcliffe was scheduled to compete in the GMR Grand Prix, the Indianapolis 500 and the Genesys 600.
Hinchcliffe finished 18th at the first race of the season at Texas Motor Speedway. He finished 11th in the Indy GP and 7th in the Indy 500. He would then replace Zach Veach for the final three races of the season in the No 26 car after the latter was fired by Andretti.

On January 26, 2021, Andretti Autosport announced that Hinchcliffe would drive the No 29 car full time for the 2021 season. He was replaced in the team by Devlin DeFrancesco for the 2022 season.

Personal life
Hinchcliffe is married to Canadian actress Rebecca Dalton.

If he did not succeed as a professional racing driver, Hinchcliffe wanted to be a motorsports journalist.

Motorsports career results

Complete A1 Grand Prix results
(key) (Races in italics indicate fastest lap)

American open–wheel racing results
(key)

Atlantic Championship

Indy Lights

IndyCar Series

* Season still in progress.
 1 The Las Vegas Indy 300 was abandoned after Dan Wheldon died from injuries sustained in a 15-car crash on lap 11.

Indianapolis 500

Touring Car racing

V8 Supercar results

† Not eligible for points

Complete Bathurst 1000 results

Complete WeatherTech SportsCar Championship

In media
On August 30, 2016, he appeared on an episode of Celebrity Family Feud featuring IndyCar drivers competing against swimsuit models. Hinchcliffe is a partner with production company Frost Marks Films out of Toronto. He maintained his podcast The Mayor on Air with James Hinchcliffe from 2015 through 2017, typically interviewing drivers from the IndyCar Series. He and fellow IndyCar driver Alexander Rossi host a podcast together called Off Track with Hinch and Rossi.

Television analyst
In 2020, Hinchcliffe joined NBC Sports as analyst for IndyCar races and select IMSA races when he did not enter as a driver.  In 2022, he rejoined NBC Sports as a full-time analyst joining play-by-play voice Leigh Diffey and analyst Townsend Bell, replacing fellow Canadian Paul Tracy, and will serve as an analyst for some IMSA races. In October of 2022, Hinchcliffe joined the crew of F1's "Weekend Warmup" for its 'grand-prix week' editions for the United States Grand Prix and the Mexico City Grand Prix. And in the Post Race Show at the Sao Paulo Grand Prix and Abu Dhabi Grand Prix

Dancing with the Stars 
On August 30, 2016, Hinchcliffe was announced as one of the celebrity contestants for season 23 of Dancing with the Stars. He was partnered with professional dancer Sharna Burgess. On November 22, 2016, Hinchcliffe finished in second place to Olympic gymnast Laurie Hernandez.

1 Score given by guest judge Pitbull.
2 Due to an injury, Burgess was unable to perform with Hinchcliffe, but did choreograph the dances. Hinchcliffe instead danced with Jenna Johnson.
3 Score given by guest judge Idina Menzel

References

External links

IndyCar Driver Page

1986 births
Living people
Racing drivers from Ontario
Sportspeople from North York
Sportspeople from Oakville, Ontario
A1 Team Canada drivers
IndyCar Series drivers
Indianapolis 500 drivers
Atlantic Championship drivers
Indy Lights drivers
Indy Pro 2000 Championship drivers
Formula BMW USA drivers
24 Hours of Daytona drivers
Rolex Sports Car Series drivers
Supercars Championship drivers
WeatherTech SportsCar Championship drivers
Canadian racing drivers
Indianapolis 500 polesitters
Forsythe Racing drivers
Arrow McLaren SP drivers
Team Moore Racing drivers
Newman/Haas Racing drivers
Andretti Autosport drivers
GoDaddy
United Autosports drivers
A1 Grand Prix drivers
Starworks Motorsport drivers
Status Grand Prix drivers
Garry Rogers Motorsport drivers